This is a list of amphibious warfare ships.

Algeria
Algerian National Navy
Active:
Kalaat Béni Abbès class - LPD
  (commissioned 2014)
Kalaat Beni Hammed class - LST
Kalaat Beni Hammed 472
Kalaat Beni Rached 473

Argentina
Argentine Navy
Decommissioned:
 – tank landing ship
 – dock landing ship

Australia

Royal Australian Navy
Active:
  – LHD
 (commissioned 2015)
 (commissioned 2014)
  – LSD
 (former )

Decommissioned:
  – LPA (ex-USN )

  – LSH

Landing Ship Tank (Mark 3) - LST
 
 
 
 
 
 
  Troop transport ship

Brazil
Brazilian Navy

Active:
  – LPD 
 
 Ocean class – LPH 
  
 Round Table class - LST
 Amirante Sabóia
  - LST
 

Decommissioned:
  - LSD
 Ceará
 Rio de Janeiro
 Round Table class - LST
 Garcia D'Avila

Canada

Planned:

Decommissioned:
 – converted passenger ship
 – converted passenger ship
 – converted passenger ship

Chile
Chilean Navy
Active:
 Foudre class – LPD
 Sargento Aldea
 Bâtiment de transport léger class - LST
 Rancagua
 Chacabuco
 Landing Ship Medium (LSM)
 Elicura

Decommissioned:
 Orompello (1964-2012)
 Newport-class tank landing ship (Chilean service: 1995–2011)
 Valdivia (ex-USS San Bernardino)
 Maipo Bâtiment de transport léger class (1981-1998)
 Calle Calle - LCU (1978-1982)
 Peuca - LCU (1978-1980) 
 Águila (ex-Aventinus, ex-LST-1092) (Chilean service: 1963–1980)- 
 Comandante Hemmerdinger (ex-USS New London County) (Chilean service: 1973–1983) - LST-542-class tank landing ship
 Comandante Araya (ex-USS Nye County) (Chilean service: 1973–1981) - LST-542-class tank landing ship
 Comandante Toro (ex-USS LST-277) (Chilean service: 1973–1977) - 
 5 ex USS-LSM: Guardiamarina Contreras (ex-USS LSM-113), Aspirante Isaza (ex-USS LSM-295), Aspirante Goycolea (ex-USS LSM-400), Aspirante Morel (ex-USS LSM-417), Aspirante Morel (ex-USS LSM-444, Aloto). - LSM-1-class landing ships medium.
 6 ex USS-LCI(L): Eduardo Llanos (ex-USS LCIL 1025), Soldado Canave (ex-USS LCIL 1027), Grumete Tellez (ex-USS LCIL 1072), Grumete Bolados (ex-USS LCIL 1073), Grumete Diaz (ex-USS LCIL 877), Cabo Bustos (ex-USS LCIL 878)
 3 ex USS-LCM
 3 ex USS-LCU
 Aquiles Troop transport ship

China
Active:
People's Liberation Army Navy
 Landing helicopter dock (LHD)  Type 075 (1 Launched/ 2 Fitting Out)
 31 - since 2021, the Hainan
 32 - since 2021, the Guangxi
 33 - since 2022, the Anhui
Amphibious Transport Dock (LPD)
  Type 071 Yuzhao class (5 active, 2 under construction)
 Kunlun Shan (998) - since 2007
 Jinggang Shan (999) - since 2011
 Changbai Shan (989) - since 2012
 Yimeng Shan (988) - since 2016
 Longhu Shan (980) - since 2018
Landing Ship Tank (LST)
 Type 072II Yuting (3 active, 0 under construction)
 Type 072III Yuting I class (10 active, 0 under construction)
 Type 072A Yuting II class (15 active, 0 under construction)
 Type 074 Yuhai class (12 active, 0 under construction)
 Type 074A Yubei class (10 active, 0 under construction)

Planned:
 Landing helicopter dock (LHD)
  Type 076 (1 planned)

Retired:
Landing Ship Tank (LST)
 Type 072 Yukan class (3 ships) all ships decommissioned on 2022
 Type 072II Yuting  1 ship  1993-2021

Egypt
Active:
  – LHD
Gamal Abdel Nasser (commissioned 2 June 2016)
Anwar El Sadat (commissioned 16 September 2016)

France
French Navy

Active:
 Mistral class – LHD
  (commissioned February 2006)
  (commissioned December 2006)
  (commissioned December 2011)

Decommissioned:
  (Champlain class) – LST
Champlain
Francis Garnier
Dumont D'Urville
Jacques Cartier
La Grandière
  – helicopter cruiser
 Foudre class – LPD 
  - LPD

Greece
Hellenic Navy
Active:

  - Landing ships
 HS Chios
 HS Samos
 HS Ikaria
 HS Lesvos
 HS Rodos
  - LCAC
 HS Kephallenia
 HS Ithaki
 HS Kerkyra
 HS Zakynthos

India
Indian Navy
Planned:
4 amphibious assault ships under the Indian Navy Multi-Role Support Vessel programme
Active:
Austin class  - LPD
  (formerly )
  - LST (3 in service)
 (4 January 2007)
 (5 April 2008) 
 (19 May 2009)
  (2 in service)
 (15 July 1987)
 (14 February 1997)
  - LST (4 in service)
 (February 1985)
 (4 June 1985)
 (December 1985)
 (November 1986)
LCU Mk4 (8 in service)
INS LCU 51
INS LCU 52
INS LCU 53
INS LCU 54
INS LCU 55
INS LCU 56
INS LCU 57
INS LCU 58

Decommissioned:

Kumbhir class (4 decommissioned)
 (December 1974 – January 2008)
 (August 1975 – May 1999)
 (December 1975 – June 1997)
 (January 1976 – July 2011)
LCU Mk1 (all (2) decommissioned)
INS LCU 31
INS LCU 32
LCU Mk2 (all (3) decommissioned)
INS LCU 33
INS LCU 34
INS LCU 35
LCU Mk3 (all 4 decommissioned)
INS LCU 36
INS LCU 37
INS LCU 38
INS LCU 39

Indonesia
Indonesian Navy

Active:
  – LPD
 
 
 
 
 
  – LPD, Later the role for this ship has changed to a hospital ship as KRI dr. Soeharso
  – LST
 
 
 
 
 
 
 
 
 
  – LSM
 
 
 
 
 
 
 
 
 
 
 
  – LST
 
 
 
 
  – LST
 
Decommissioned:
  – LSM
 
 
 
  – LST
 
 
  – LST
 
  – LST
 
 
 
 
 
 
 
 
 
  – LST

Iran
Islamic Republic of Iran Navy
Active:
 
 
 
Unknown:
IIS Sohrab

Italy

Italian Navy
Under construction:
 , a landing helicopter dock ship launched in 2019
Active:
  – LPD
  (commissioned 1988)
  (commissioned 1988)
  (commissioned 1994)
Decommissioned:
 De Soto County-class tank landing ship

Japan
Japan Maritime Self-Defense Force
Active:
  – LPD (DDH)
 JDS Hyūga (commissioned 2009) 
 JDS Ise (commissioned 2011) 
Ōsumi class – LPD
JDS Ōsumi (commissioned 1998)
JDS Shimokita (commissioned 2002)
JDS Kunisaki (commissioned 2003)
Decommissioned:
Miura class – LST 
JDS Ojika
JDS Satsuma
JDS Miura
Atsumi class – LST
JDS Atsumi
JDS Motubu
JDS Nemuro
Shinshū Maru
No.101-class landing ship
SS-class landing ship

Netherlands
Royal Netherlands Navy
Active:
 Rotterdam class - LPD 
 HNLMS Rotterdam (commissioned 1998)
 HNLMS Johan de Witt (commissioned 2007)
 Karel Doorman class - LPD
 HNLMS Karel Doorman (commissioned 2015)

New Zealand
Royal New Zealand Navy
Planned:
 Defence Capability Plan 2019 stats that the RNZN will procure a Enhance Sealift Vessel (ESV) and be in service around 2029 as well as second to replace HMNZS Canterbury keeping 2 ship amphibious fleet in 2035.

Active:
  - LPA (commissioned 2007)

Decommissioned:
  Decommissioned in July 2001

Norway
Royal Norwegian Navy
Active:
  - LCP
 Tjelsund class - LST

Oman
Royal Navy of Oman
Active:
Nasr al Bahr (L2)
Fulk al Salamah (L3)
Decommissioned:
Al Munassir (L1)

Philippines 
Philippine Navy

Active:
  - LPD

Russia/Soviet Union
Russian Navy/Soviet Navy

Planned:
Project 23900 amphibious assault ship – LHD (2 ordered)
Sevastopol
Vladivostok
Active:
Ivan Gren class – LSD (1 active, 1 in sea trials, 2 under construction)
Ivan Gren
Ivan Rogov class – LSD (2 in reserve)
Moskalenko
Alexsandr Nikolaev
Ropucha class – LST (15 active)
12 Project 775 (Ropucha I)
3 Project 775M (Ropucha II)
Decommissioned: 
Ivan Rogov class – LSD
Ivan Rogov
Ropucha class – LST
13 Project 775 (Ropucha I)

Singapore
Republic of Singapore Navy
Active:
 Endurance class – LPD 
 RSS Endurance (207)
 RSS Resolution (208)
 RSS Persistence (209)
 RSS Endeavour (210)

Decommissioned:
County class – LST
RSS Endurance (L201)
 RSS Excellence (L202)
 RSS Intrepid (L203)
 RSS Resolution (L204)
 RSS Persistence (L205)
Round Table class – LSL
 RSS Perseverance (L206)

South Korea
Republic of Korea Navy
Planned
Dokdo class – LHD
Baengnyeong 
Active:
Dokdo class – LHD
Dokdo (commissioned 2007)
Marado (commissioned 2020)
Cheon Wang Bong class – LST
Cheon Wang Bong
Cheon Ja Bong
Il Chul Bong
No Jeok Bong
Kojoonbong class – LST
Go Jun Bong
Bi Ro Bong
Hyang Ro Bong
Sung In Bong
Decommissioned:
Un Bong class – LST
Bi Bong
Tuk Bong
Buk Han
Kae Bong
Hwa San
Su Yong
Un Bong
Wee Bong

Spain
Armada Española

Active:
Galicia class – LPD
Galicia (commissioned 1998)
Castilla (commissioned 2000)
Juan Carlos I class – LHD (BPE)
  (commissioned 2010) (universal ship, has the function of fleet carrier and amphibious assault ship)

Decommissioned:
Hernan Cortes class – LST
 Hernán Cortés (Ex-USS Harlan County)
 Pizarro (Ex-USS Barnstable County)
Haskell class
Aragón
Andromeda class
Castilla
Terrebonne Parish class (LST)
Velasco
Martín Álvarez
Conde de Venadito
Paul Revere class
Castilla
Aragón
Casa Grande class (LSD)
Galicia

Thailand

Royal Thai Navy
Planned:
  Type 071 Yuzhao class - LPD (1 under construction)
Active:
 Endurance class – LPD
 
 modified Príncipe de Asturias class – CVH
  (commissioned 1997)
 Normed PS 700 class – LST
 
 
Decommissioned:
  – LST
 HTMS Angthong

Turkey

 - (training ship, ex )

United Kingdom
Royal Navy
Active:
Albion class – LPD
HMS Albion
HMS Bulwark
RFA Argus – aviation support/training ship 
Bay class – LSD 
RFA Lyme Bay
RFA Mounts Bay
RFA Cardigan Bay

Decommissioned:

HMS Ocean – LPH
Centaur-class aircraft carriers – LPH
HMS Albion 
HMS Bulwark
Colossus class - Commando carrier ships
Ocean
Theseus
Fearless class – LPD
HMS Fearless 
HMS Intrepid
Round Table class  – LSL 
RFA Sir Geraint
RFA Sir Lancelot
RFA Sir Percivale
Maracaibo class - LST
 
 
 
Boxer class - LST
 
 
 

LST Mk.3 class

United States

Venezuela
Bolivarian Navy of Venezuela
Planned:
Los Frailes class (Damen Stan Lander 5612) Roll-on/Roll-off medium vessels capable of beaching - AKR
(up to 8 ships with hull prefix "T", ship names and hull numbers yet to be determined)

Active:
Capana class (Korea Tacoma Alligator MK.III) – LST
T-61 AB Capana
T-62 AB Esequibo
T-63 AB Goajira
T-64 AB Los Llanos
Los Frailes class (Damen Stan Lander 5612) Roll-on/Roll-off medium vessels capable of beaching - AKR
T-91 AB Los Frailes
T-92 AB Los Testigos
T-93 AB Los Roques
T-94 AB Los Monjes
Margarita class (Swiftships model 130LS0791) Landing Craft Utility – LCU
T-71 AB Margarita
T-72 AB La Orchila

Decommissioned:
Capana class (Bethlehem-Hingham Shipyard LST-542 class) landing ship tank – LST
T-11 FNV Capana  (ex-) (Venezuelan service: 1946–1957)
Capana class (Ingalls Shipbuilding Terrebonne Parish-class) landing ship tank – LST
T-21 ARV Amazonas (ex-USS AVernon County, ex-LST-1161) (Venezuelan service: 1973–1977)
Los Monjes class (LSM-1class) landing ship Medium – LSM
T-13 ARV Los Monjes (ex-LSM-548) (Venezuelan service: 1959–1979)
T-14 ARV Los Roques (ex-LSM-543) (Venezuelan service: 1959–1965)
T-15 ARV Los Frailes (ex-LSM-544) (Venezuelan service: 1959–1986)  
T-16 ARV Los Testigos (ex-LSM-545) (Venezuelan service: 1960–1979)
No Name (ex-LSM-542) (Transferred, 15 July 1959, to Venezuela, for cannibalization) 
Guayana class (LST-1151/Achelous Class) landing ship tank – LST / Landing Craft Repair Ship - ARL
T-18 / T-31 ARV Guayana (ex-USS Quirinus, ex-LST-1151/ex-ARL-39) (Venezuelan service: 1962-??)

Vietnam
Vietnam People's Navy

Active:
Tran Khanh Du (HQ-501) ex-USS Maricopa County (LST-938)
Polnocny class - LST
HQ-511
HQ-512
HQ-521

Abbreviations
 LHA = Landing Helicopter Assault
 LHD = Landing Helicopter Dock
 LPD = Landing Platform Dock
 LPH = Landing Platform Helicopter
 LSD = Landing Ship Dock
 LSH = Landing Ship Heavy
 LSL = Landing Ship Logistics
 LST = Landing Ship Tank

See also
 Amphibious assault ship
 Amphibious warfare ship
 List of aircraft carriers in service

References

Ships
Lists of ships